Kayah may refer to:

 Kayah (singer), a Polish singer
 Kayah State, a state of Myanmar
 Kayah people (Karenni people)
 Kayah language (Karenni language)
 Kayah Li alphabet

See also 
 Kaya (disambiguation)
 Kayyah, a village in the Liwa Oasis of the UAE

Language and nationality disambiguation pages